Carpentras (formerly ; Provençal Occitan: Carpentràs in classical norm or Carpentras in Mistralian norm) is a commune in the Vaucluse department in the Provence-Alpes-Côte d'Azur region in southeastern France.

As capital of the Comtat Venaissin, it was frequently the residence of the Avignon popes; the Papal States retained possession of the Venaissin until the French Revolution. Nowadays, Carpentras is a commercial center for Comtat Venaissin and is famous for the black truffle markets held from winter to early spring.

Carpentras briefly held France's all-time high-temperature record, during the heatwave of June 2019.

History

Classical antiquity

Carpentras was a commercial site used by Greek merchants in ancient times, and known to Romans at first as Carpentoracte Meminorum, mentioned by Pliny, then renamed Forum Neronis ("Forum of Nero"); the city retains an impressive Roman triumphal arch, that has been enclosed by the bishops' palace, rebuilt in 1640, now a law court, and a machicolated city gate, the Porte d'Orange.

Ancient Diocese of Carpentras
For the history of the bishopric of Carpentras, see Ancient Diocese of Carpentras.

Middle Ages
At the beginning of the Avignon Papacy, Pope Clement V took up residence, along with the Roman Curia, in Carpentras in 1313. His successor, Pope John XXII, settled definitively at Avignon.

Municipal library
Joseph-Dominique d'Inguimbert, Bishop of Carpentras from 1735 to 1754, established a great scholarly library which Jean-François Delmas, the chief librarian as of 2009, has called "the oldest of our municipal libraries"; known as the Bibliothèque Inguimbertine and now holding around 140,000 books, it is known to bibliophiles all over France and is scheduled to move into roomier quarters in the former Hôtel-Dieu in 2013.

French Revolution and return to France
Until 1791, Carpentras was part of the Papal States, not of the Kingdom of France.

Like most communities across France, Carpentras played a role in the 1789-1799 French Revolution, particularly during the rule of the French Directory. After the 'Anti-Royalist' September 4, 1797 Coup of 18 Fructidor, on October 22, 1797, counter-revolutionaries take the city's government and hold it in protest for 24 hours.

Jewish community
Into the 20th and 21st centuries, Carpentras has been an important centre of French Judaism and is home to the oldest synagogue in France, which opened in 1367 and is still active today. The Jewish cemetery was desecrated by members of the French and European Nationalist Party in May 1990, causing a public uproar and a demonstration in Paris that was attended by 200,000 people, including then-president François Mitterrand.

Population

Geography
Carpentras stands on the banks of the river Auzon, a tributary of the Sorgue. It is 23 km southwest of Mont Ventoux, and 23 km northeast of Avignon. Carpentras station has rail connections to Sorgues and Avignon.

Climate
In the Köppen climate classification, Carpentras has a borderline humid subtropical (Cfa), and hot-summer mediterranean climate (Csa) with cool winters and hot summers. The rainiest seasons are spring (April–May) and autumn (September–October), where heavy downpours may happen.

Traditions

Carpentras is famous for the Truffle market that takes place every Friday morning during the winter months.

Its traditional confectionery is the berlingot, a small hard candy with thin white stripes, originally made from the syrup left over from conservation of fruits.

Personalities
Carpentras was the birthplace of (chronologically):
 Carpentras (also known as Elzéar Genet) (c.1470–1548), prominent early Renaissance composer
 Hercule Audiffret (1603-1659), orator and Superior General of the Congrégation des Doctrinaires
 Louis Archimbaud (1705–1789), composer and organist of Carpentras Cathedral
 Joseph Duplessis (1725–1802), portraitist
 Jean-Pierre-Xavier Bidauld (1743–1813), painter
 Jean-Joseph-Xavier Bidauld (1758–1846), painter
 Alexis-Vincent-Charles Berbiguier de Terre-Neuve du Thym, (1765–1851), author and demonologist
 Victor Olivier de Puymanel (1768–1799), French Navy volunteer, and adventurer in Vietnam
 François-Vincent Raspail (1794–1878), chemist, physiologist, and socialist
 Jean-Joseph Bonaventure Laurens (1801–1890), painter, lithographer, musician
 Édouard Daladier (1884–1970) politician and Prime Minister of France at the start of the Second World War
 Daniel Lazard (1941–), computer scientist
 Bruno Boscherie (1950–), fencer, Olympic Gold medalist
 Christophe Maé (1975–), musician and composer
 Éric Salignon (1982–), racing driver
 Thomas Mangani (1987–), professional footballer
 Raphaël Cacérès (1987–), professional footballer

International relations

Carpentras is twinned with:
 Vevey, Switzerland
 Seesen, Germany
 Ponchatoula, Louisiana, USA
 Camaiore, Italy

See also
 Arch of Carpentras
 Communes of the Vaucluse department
 Henri Raybaud

References

External links

 Carpentras official website (in French)
 
 Pictures of Carpentras Cathedral: , 

 
Communes of Vaucluse
Subprefectures in France